Korean Golf Tour may refer to:

Korean Tour, for men
LPGA of Korea Tour, for women